Seyfi Tatar (born 26 May 1948) is a Turkish boxer. He competed at the 1968 Summer Olympics and the 1972 Summer Olympics. At the 1972 Summer Olympics, he lost to Pasqualino Morbidelli of Italy in his first fight.

References

1948 births
Living people
Turkish male boxers
Olympic boxers of Turkey
Boxers at the 1968 Summer Olympics
Boxers at the 1972 Summer Olympics
People from Sivas
Mediterranean Games silver medalists for Turkey
Mediterranean Games medalists in boxing
Competitors at the 1967 Mediterranean Games
Featherweight boxers
20th-century Turkish people